Pramollo (French: Pramol) is a comune (municipality) in the Metropolitan City of Turin in the Italian region Piedmont, located about  southwest of Turin.

References

Cities and towns in Piedmont